Lokoya (Miwok: Lakáa-yomi, meaning "place of the cottonwood") is an unincorporated community in Napa County, California, United States. It lies at an elevation of 1,765 feet (538 m).

History
The town was formerly known as Solid Comfort.

The Solid Comfort post office opened in 1918, changed its name to Lokoya in 1925, and closed in 1951. The Redwood Cemetery along with the former settlement of Spruce Hill, California is located to the southeast.

References

Unincorporated communities in California
Unincorporated communities in Napa County, California